Love You Better may refer to:
"Love You Better" (Future song), 2022
"Love You Better" (The Maccabees song), 2009
"Love You Better" (Oh Land song), 2013
"Love You Better", a song by Olly Murs from the 2018 album You Know I Know

See also
"Love U Better", a song by Ty Dolla Sign
"Luv U Better", a song by LL Cool J